Mon Yong-ik (Hangul: 문용익) (born February 4, 1995, in Goyang, Gyeonggi) is a South Korean pitcher for the Samsung Lions in the Korea Baseball Organization (KBO).

References 

Samsung Lions players
KBO League pitchers
South Korean baseball players
1995 births
Living people
People from Goyang
Sportspeople from Gyeonggi Province